Chit San Maung may refer to:

 Chit San Maung (footballer) (b. 1988), Burmese footballer
 Chit San Maung (guitarist), leader of the band Iron Cross